Franz Gabriel Fiesinger or Flesinger (12 March 1723 – 21 February 1807) was a German engraver.

He was born in Offenburg and raised by Jesuits until the order was dissolved in 1773. He spent the rest of his youth in Germany under the painter Franz S. Stöber, before moving to Switzerland and then France, where he engraved portraits of members of the National Convention. When the Reign of Terror broke out he moved to London, remaining there until 1798 and the birth of the French Consulate. He returned to France, where he reproduced in medallion format the portraits by Jean-Urbain Guérin of Kléber, Desaix, Masséna, Régnier and other Republican generals. He also produced illustrations for the physiognomy of Lavater and engraved several assignats for the mint. He moved back to London in 1802, dying there five years later.

Galerie

External links 

18th-century engravers
19th-century engravers
German engravers
1723 births
1807 deaths
Currency designers
Musicians from Baden-Württemberg
People from Offenburg